The 2016 Dollar General Bowl was a postseason college football bowl game that was played at Ladd–Peebles Stadium in Mobile, Alabama on December 23, 2016. The 18th edition of the Dollar General Bowl (previously called the GoDaddy Bowl) featured the Ohio Bobcats of the Mid-American Conference versus the Troy Trojans of the Sun Belt Conference.

Teams
The game featured the Ohio Bobcats against the Troy Trojans.

This was the second meeting between the schools; the first meeting was in the 2010 New Orleans Bowl, where the Trojans defeated the Bobcats by a score of 48–21.  Coincidentally, that had been Troy's most recent bowl appearance prior to this game.

Ohio

Troy

Game summary

Scoring summary

Statistics

References

External links
 ESPN summary

2016–17 NCAA football bowl games
LendingTree Bowl
Ohio Bobcats football bowl games
Troy Trojans football bowl games
2016 in sports in Alabama
December 2016 sports events in the United States